Marcelle Mercenier (21 April 1920 – 13 March 1996) was a Belgian pianist and teacher.

Life
Mercenier was known as an influential pedagogue in Brussels, then in Liège. She was a fervent advocate of contemporary music but also performed Chopin under the baton of Charles Munch and Poulenc with the composer.

She was a member of the group "Séminaire des Arts" created in August 1944 in Brussels. In the concert series of this group, on 28 February 1947 she premiered, together with the flautist Herlin Van Boterdael, the Sonatina for flute and piano by Pierre Boulez, a work that had been composed a year earlier for Jean-Pierre Rampal, but had not been performed by him. The Sonatina was the second work in which Boulez used serial technique, after the Notations for piano of 1945. She premiered works by Karlheinz Stockhausen (Klavierstücke I–IV, which are dedicated to her), Henri Pousseur, and Philippe Boesmans.

Discography
Mercenier recorded the complete Debussy Etudes.

References

Sources

Further reading
 Kolbert, Jack. 1972. "Butor, Michel: Dialogue avec 33 variations de Ludwig van Beethoven sur une valse de Diabelli. Paris: Gallimard-NRF, 1971 ". The French Review 45, no. 4 (March): 899–900. 

1920 births
1996 deaths
Belgian pianists
Belgian women pianists
20th-century pianists
Women classical pianists
20th-century women pianists